Babbal Rai  is an Indian Punjabi singer, songwriter and film actor.

Music career 
Babbal Rai made his debut with the album "sau putt the first chapter" which brought him into the limelight in the music industry. His album, which was brought by the label Point Zero in March 2010, the album however was not a huge hit as Rai was unable to come to India and promote his album. Meanwhile, he worked and collected money for making music and videos. In 2012 he released his single track "Sohni". It is reported that Rai feels that his claim to fame is to sing what he feels from his heart.

In 2014 Babbal released his second album Girlfriend under the label Speed Records.

Film career 
He started his film career by special guest appearance in the Punjabi Film in Singh vs Kaur in 2013 starring Gippy Grewal and Surveen Chawla. In 2014 he featured in his debut film Mr and Mrs 420 along with Jassi Gill, Yuvraj Hans, Binnu Dhillon, and Jaswinder Bhalla and appeared in a dual-role cameo, a first in Punjabi film industry.

Discography

Singles

Filmography

References 

Living people
Male actors from Punjab, India
Indian male singer-songwriters
Indian singer-songwriters
Male actors in Punjabi cinema
21st-century Indian singers
Singers from Punjab, India
21st-century Indian male singers
1985 births